John Patrick Hayes is an Irish-American computer scientist and electrical engineer, the Claude E. Shannon Chair of Engineering Science at the University of Michigan.

Biography
Hayes did his undergraduate studies at the National University of Ireland, Dublin, graduating in 1965. He went on to graduate studies at the University of Illinois at Urbana–Champaign, earning a master's degree in 1967 and a Ph.D. in 1970. After working in The Hague for Shell for two years, he returned to academia, taking a faculty position at the University of Southern California in 1972, and then moving to Michigan in 1982.

Research
Hayes is the author of the books
Digital System Design and Microprocessors (McGraw-Hill, 1984)
Introduction to Digital Logic Design (Addison-Wesley, 1993)
Computer Architecture and Organization (3rd ed., McGraw-Hill, 2002)
Quantum Circuit Simulation (with George F. Viamontes and Igor L. Markov, Springer, 2009)

Hayes has written extensively on the use of hypercube graphs in supercomputing,
He has also written highly cited research papers on fault-tolerant design, reversible computing, and stochastic computing.

Awards and honors
Hayes became an IEEE Fellow in 1985 "for contributions to digital testing techniques and to switching theory and logical design", and an ACM Fellow in 2001 "for outstanding contributions to logic design and testing and to fault-tolerant computer architecture." In 2004, the University of Illinois department of electrical and computer engineering gave him their distinguished alumni award.

References

External links
 Mathematics Genealogy

Year of birth missing (living people)
Living people
Alumni of University College Dublin
American computer scientists
American electrical engineers
Irish computer scientists
Fellow Members of the IEEE
Fellows of the Association for Computing Machinery
Grainger College of Engineering alumni
University of Michigan faculty
University of Southern California faculty